Burntwood is a ghost town in Rawlins County, Kansas, United States.

History
Burntwood was issued a post office in 1886. The post office was discontinued in 1899, reissued in 1903, then permanently discontinued in 1907.

References

Further reading

External links
 Rawlins County maps: Current, Historic, KDOT

Former populated places in Rawlins County, Kansas
Former populated places in Kansas
1886 establishments in Kansas
Populated places established in 1886